Sameh Naguib is an Egyptian sociologist at the American University in Cairo, a socialist activist. In 2006 he published a short book analysing the history and growth of the Muslim Brotherhood titled The Muslim Brotherhood- A socialist viewpoint.

In 2007, Naguib was a speaker at the fifth Cairo Anti-war Conference, which he used as a platform to condemn former President Hosni Mubarak and pointed to Egypt's striking workers as a way forward for the movement:

[T]he struggle against Mubarak’s regime is just in its beginning and not end as the regime hopes. Despite the constitutional coup, passed by force and forgery, the Egyptian state terrorism will not intimidate us. Their laws and dictatorial constitution will not deter us from fighting for freedom and justice. 

He is the author of several articles and a pamphlet, The Egyptian Revolution: A Political Analysis and Eyewitness Account (London: Bookmarks, 2011).

See also 
 Revolutionary Socialists
The Egyptian Revolution: A Political Analysis and Eyewitness Account by Sameh Naguib (London: Bookmarks, 2011).

References 

Academic staff of The American University in Cairo
Egyptian democracy activists
Egyptian dissidents
Egyptian human rights activists
Egyptian revolutionaries
Egyptian Trotskyists
Egyptian sociologists
Egyptian trade unionists
Living people
People of the Egyptian revolution of 2011
Revolutionary Socialists (Egypt)
Egyptian nationalists
Egyptian activists
Year of birth missing (living people)